The Manila Hotel is a 550-room, historic five-star hotel located along Manila Bay in Manila, Philippines. The hotel is the oldest premiere hotel in the Philippines built in 1909 to rival Malacañang Palace, the official residence of the President of the Philippines and was opened on the commemoration of American Independence on July 4, 1912. Its penthouse served as the residence of General Douglas MacArthur during his tenure as the Military Advisor of the Philippine Commonwealth from 1935 to 1941.

The hotel used to host the offices of several foreign news organizations, including The New York Times. It has hosted world leaders and celebrities, including authors Ernest Hemingway and James A. Michener; actors Douglas Fairbanks, Jr. and John Wayne; publisher Henry Luce; entertainers Sammy Davis, Jr., Michael Jackson and The Beatles; and U.S. President Bill Clinton.

The hotel tower, built as part of the hotel's renovation and expansion from 1975 to 1977, is the tallest hotel tower in the Manila Bay area.

History

When the United States took over the Philippine Islands from the Spanish in 1898 after the Spanish–American War, President William McKinley began Americanizing the former Spanish colony. In 1900 he appointed William Howard Taft to head the Philippine Commission to evaluate the needs of the new territory. Taft, who later became the Philippines' first civilian Governor-General, decided that Manila, the capital, should be a planned town. He hired as his architect and city planner Daniel Hudson Burnham, who had built Union Station and the Postal Square Building in Washington. In Manila, Burnham had in mind a long, wide, tree-lined boulevard along the bay, beginning at a park area dominated by a magnificent hotel. To execute Burnham's plans, Taft hired William E. Parsons, a New York City architect, who envisioned an impressive, comfortable hotel along the lines of a California mission but grander. The original design was an H-shaped plan that focused on well-ventilated rooms on two wings, providing grand vistas of the harbor, the Luneta, and Intramuros. The top floor was, in fact, a large viewing deck that was used for various functions, including watching the American navy steam into the harbor.

The hotel was finished construction in 1912 and opened on July 4, 1912 to commemorate American Independence Day. The hotel was owned by private individuals and firms until 1919 when the Insular Government purchased all outstanding shares and put the Manila Hotel Company under the Manila Railroad Company.

First renovation
During the start of the Philippine Commonwealth in 1935, President Manuel Quezon hired Paris-trained Filipino architect Andres P. Luna, son of painter Juan N. Luna to take charge of the ₱1,000,000 renovation of the Manila Hotel, equivalent to $10,000,000 in 2020 USD. It was done under the supervision of the renowned engineering firm Pedro Siochi and Company. The hotel was the residence of General Douglas MacArthur when he became the Military Advisor of the Commonwealth. Luna converted the hotel's top floor into an elegant penthouse and expanded the west wing northward – creating the air-conditioned annex - and designed some key public rooms like the Fiesta Pavilion, then the biggest function room of the hotel. The hotel was the site of festivities during the inauguration of the Philippine Commonwealth government in November 1935. Throughout 1936, the hotel profitted from the mining boom with annual revenue increasing 7.6% and business increasing two to sixfold in the slack period of April–September, breaking its trend of only breaking even or ending the year in a loss. In the late 30's the hotel was advertized as the Aristocrat of the Orient.

World War II
During World War II, the hotel was occupied by Japanese troops, and the Japanese flag was flown above the walls for the entirety of the war. During the Battle for the Liberation of Manila, the hotel was set on fire by the Japanese. The shell of the building survived the blaze and the structure was later reconstructed.

President Ferdinand Marcos
During the time of President Ferdinand Marcos, in accordance with Presidential Decree no. 645, the old Manila Hotel Company was liquidated and the government took over its ownership. The Government Service Insurance System (GSIS) was given the mandate to form a new subsidiary corporation that would restore, renovate, and expand the Manila Hotel. In the following two decades, Mr. Marcos's wife, Imelda, could frequently be seen at the hotel restaurants. During her visits, a red carpet and garlands were put out and the air was sprayed with deodorant. Under Imelda's patronage, the hotel reaped international recognition and awards. It was the place to go and be seen during the Martial Law years.

1975 renovation

The hotel was remodeled in 1975 and expanded to 570 rooms with the addition of the high-rise hotel building behind the original five-story structure. The renovations were headed by National Artists for Architecture Leandro Locsin and Ildefonso Santos with Patricia Keller, a partner in the international interior design firm of Dale Keller & Associates. Guest amenities were updated including executive services, language translation, a business library, and color television and closed circuit movies. The hotel's spartan interiors in simplified Mission style gave way to more lavish furnishings. Inauguration and formal reopening ceremonies of the Manila Hotel was held on October 6, 1977.

Transfer of ownership
Around 1995, the Government Service Insurance System (GSIS) called for a bidding to sell the property. The tender went to a Malaysian firm, the Renong Berhad and ITT-Sheraton combine over Emilio Yap, a Chinese Filipino billionaire tycoon and owner of the Manila Bulletin, the country's largest newspaper by circulation. Yap went to the Supreme Court of the Philippines and won by matching Rehong's bid and citing the Constitution's Filipino First policy in the ownership of a 'national patrimony'. Fifty-one percent of the ownership was awarded to Yap's Manila Prince Hotel Corporation (MPHC), while new owners joined on April 25, 1997, as 49 percent shareholder. Yap signed a check for ₱673.2 million and the MPHC took over the property on May 7, 1997. One of the first things Yap did was to pull down the three brass chandeliers in the lobby, upon recommendation of a feng shui expert, and replace them with five.

Centennial
In 2008, the Manila Hotel underwent a series of renovations in time for its centennial celebration in 2012. All of the hotel's rooms were refurbished and renovated and equipped with modern facilities and amenities. The rooms' windows were enlarged. The hotel also opened a Health Club next to the Manila Hotel Health Spa.

On January 17, 2008, the Manila Hotel Tent City, located west of the original structure was opened. The performance/conference hall could accommodate 2,500 guests for wedding receptions, anniversaries, conventions, and exhibitions. Its high ceilings allow even the most complex of venue set-ups and design. The Tent became the center stage when the hotel celebrated its 100th anniversary with a Centennial Ball on July 4, 2012, with President Benigno Aquino III as the guest-of-honor.

Political events
Through the years, Manila Hotel has been the scene of historic events in the country.  The Philippine Constitutional Convention of 1970 was held at the Fiesta Pavilion of the hotel on November 10. The convention attended by 320 delegates was called to change the Philippine Constitution that has been in existence since the start of the Philippine Commonwealth in 1935.

The political party of Ferdinand Marcos held its convention at the Manila Hotel before the February 1986 presidential election and Corazon C. Aquino delivered a speech at the hotel that was a turning point in her presidential campaign.  Marcos's rule ended in February 1986 after the 1986 EDSA Revolution.

On July 6, 1986, a group of military officers loyal to deposed President Marcos took over the Manila Hotel and declared Arturo Tolentino, who was Marcos's vice presidential running mate, as president. However, the coup did not last long, they surrendered two days later.

The hotel received international attention in 1999 when Imelda Marcos, the former First Lady, celebrated her 70th birthday in this hotel. More than 1,000 of Manila's elite turned up in the event.

Features

Lobby
The floor is Philippine marble; the chandeliers are made of brass, crystal, and seashells; the furniture is carved out of Philippine mahogany, which is used throughout the hotel.

Suites
The three-bedroom MacArthur suite was the residence of Gen. MacArthur while living in the country. The suite is located on the 5th floor of the original structure.

The Penthouse, the most expensive suite with its private swimming pool on the 18th floor, has a view of Manila Bay, Rizal Park and the 16th-century Spanish walled city of Intramuros opposite the hotel. Like the Presidential Suite, the penthouse is decorated with rare paintings, Asian antiques and Filipino crafts. The MacArthur, Presidential and Penthouse Suites provide 24-hour butler service.

Facilities and services
The hotel's guest facilities and other services include limousine and luxury car rental, a helipad on the roof deck, airport transfer and transport assistance, medical clinic, a Business Center with Internet access, 24-hour full menu room service and concierge, laundry service, a delicatessen, a hair salon and souvenir shops.

Recreation
The Manila Hotel Spa is located by the bay offering massages and other therapies. Guests could use the outdoor pool and the Health Club.

Restaurants
The hotel has three restaurants, three bars and a delicatessen offering a range of cuisines, from Chinese to European. These are Cafe Ilang-Ilang, Red Jade, Champagne Room, Tap Room Bar, Lobby Lounge and Pool Bar.

See also
 
 Naval Base Manila

References

External links
 Official site

Hotels in Manila
Buildings and structures in Ermita
Convention and exhibition centers in Metro Manila
Heritage Houses in the Philippines
Cultural Properties of the Philippines in Metro Manila
Landmarks in the Philippines
Hotel buildings completed in 1912
Hotels established in 1912
1912 establishments in the Philippines
Works of National Artists of the Philippines
Modernist architecture in the Philippines
Neoclassical architecture in the Philippines
Spanish Colonial Revival architecture